Nelson Brown Hatch (February 26, 1879 – April 20, 1956) was an American football coach. He served the fourth head football coach at New York University (NYU).  He held that position for the 1900 season, leading the NYU Violets to a record of 3–6–1.

Head coaching record

References

1879 births
1956 deaths
NYU Violets football coaches
Sportspeople from Bridgeport, Connecticut